"By Chance" is a song by American hip hop duo Rae Sremmurd. It was released on February 13, 2016 by EarDrummers and Interscope Records, as the first single from their second studio album SremmLife 2. The song was produced by Mike Will Made It and Resource.

Music video
The song's accompanying music video premiered on March 17, 2016 on Rae Sremmurd's YouTube account on Vevo. The video received 56 million views.

Commercial performance
"By Chance" did not chart on the Billboard Hot 100, but was certified Gold by the RIAA.

Personnel
Credits adapted from SremmLife 2 booklet.

Song credits

Writing – Aaquil Brown, Khalif Brown, Michael Williams II, Braylin Bowman
Production – Mike Will Made It
Co-production – Resource
Recording – Randy Lanphear & Swae Lee at Sauce Studios & Tree Sound Studios in Atlanta, Georgia
Audio mixing – Stephen Hybicki at Sauce Studios in Atlanta, Georgia
Assistant mix engineering – Randy Lanphear
Mastering – Dave Kutch, The Mastering Palace, New York City

Charts

References

External links

2016 songs
2016 singles
Rae Sremmurd songs
Interscope Records singles
Song recordings produced by Mike Will Made It
Songs written by Mike Will Made It
Songs written by Swae Lee
Songs written by Slim Jxmmi